De'Riante Jenkins (born November 12, 1996) is an American professional basketball player for BC Luleå of the Swedish Basketligan. He played college basketball for the VCU Rams.

Early life and high school career
Jenkins grew up in Eutawville, South Carolina and played basketball and football. He attended Lake Marion High School and led the team to a 2013 state title. On the gridiron, Jenkins played quarterback and threw for 3,500 yards and 26 touchdowns as a sophomore, before deciding to focus completely on basketball. For his senior season, he originally opted to transfer to Oldsmar Christian School in Oklahoma, but was expelled shortly after the beginning of the school year. Jenkins was accepted to West Oaks Academy in Florida several days later. He completed a postgraduate year at Hargrave Military Academy and averaged 22 points per game. Jenkins was a highly-rated recruit, considered a four-star prospect ranked No. 43 in his class. In September 2015, he committed to playing college basketball for VCU, choosing the Rams over offers from Clemson, South Carolina and Tennessee.

College career
Jenkins averaged 4.3 points and 1.7 rebounds per game as a freshman. He sat out 15 games due to breaking his right foot. On November 21, 2017, Jenkins scored a career-high 27 points and had 11 rebounds in an 83–69 win over California. As a sophomore, Jenkins averaged 12.9 points and 3.7 rebounds per game. Jenkins averaged 11.3 points and 3.9 rebounds per game as a junior, emerging as a leader on the team and helping VCU reach the NCAA Tournament. He was named to the Third Team All-Atlantic 10. On February 29, 2020, Jenkins stepped away from basketball due to an undisclosed health issue. As a senior, he averaged 10.7 points, 4.2 rebounds, 2 assists, and 1.9 steals per game, shooting 40 percent from the floor.

Professional career
On August 5, 2021, Jenkins signed his first professional contract with BC Luleå of the Swedish Basketligan.

Career statistics

College

|-
| style="text-align:left;"| 2016–17
| style="text-align:left;"| VCU
| 21 || 0 || 12.3 || .500 || .455 || .625 || 1.7 || .5 || .3 || .1 || 4.3
|-
| style="text-align:left;"| 2017–18
| style="text-align:left;"| VCU
| 33 || 33 || 29.5 || .433 || .418 || .750 || 3.7 || 2.5 || 1.3 || .2 || 12.9
|-
| style="text-align:left;"| 2018–19
| style="text-align:left;"| VCU
| 32 || 32 || 28.0 || .405 || .341 || .750 || 3.9 || 2.0 || .8 || .5 || 11.3
|-
| style="text-align:left;"| 2019–20
| style="text-align:left;"| VCU
| 28 || 28 || 26.8 || .396 || .333 || .875 || 4.2 || 2.0 || 1.9 || .3 || 10.7
|- class="sortbottom"
| style="text-align:center;" colspan="2"| Career
| 114 || 93 || 25.3 || .419 || .374 || .785 || 3.5 || 1.9 || 1.1 || .3 || 10.3

Personal life
His father, Ty Jenkins, was shot and killed outside his home on September 30, 2014. Jenkins has a son. He enjoys skateboarding and working out with his girlfriend.

References

External links
VCU Rams bio

1996 births
Living people
American men's basketball players
Basketball players from South Carolina
VCU Rams men's basketball players
People from Orangeburg County, South Carolina
Shooting guards
Hargrave Military Academy alumni